Michael Shvo (born December 29, 1972) is a real estate developer based in New York City with offices in Miami, San Francisco, Los Angeles, and Chicago. He is the Chairman and CEO of SHVO, a real estate development company he founded in 2004.

Early life and education
Shvo was raised in Arsuf, Israel, by parents who were both chemistry professors. He completed his military service in Israel and received a B.A. in finance at Bar-Ilan University. In 1996, he emigrated to the United States from Israel with only $3,000.

Career
Shvo initially managed a fleet of taxis prior to landing a job as a real-estate broker with Douglas Elliman, the largest brokerage in New York. In 2003, at the age of 30, he achieved more than $300 million in sales from more than 400 deals, becoming the firm's top broker. He created his own group within the firm and managed a staff of 27 people. 

Shvo left the firm in 2004 to launch his own international real estate firm, SHVO. His firm develops high end properties internationally. From 2003 through 2008, he performed $15 billion in real estate transactions worldwide, including Nurai, a private island off the coast of Abu Dhabi. Additional developments in New York included the Bryant Park Tower, The Lumiere on 53rd Street in Manhattan, Gramercy Starck designed by Philippe Starck, Jade by Jade Jagger, Fultonhaus, as well as Amangiri in Utah and Nizuc in Mexico. He was known for creating the marriage of fashion and real estate with his project 20 Pine Armani Casa, where Armani was hired to design the interior of the building.

Shvo took a break from real estate in 2008, focusing on his interest in the art world. He got back into the real estate market in 2013, initially purchasing a Getty Oil gas station at the corner of 10th Avenue and 24th Street in West Chelsea, Manhattan. He paid $23.5 million for the property which was a record price for per buildable square foot in Manhattan.

Prior to the development of the Getty property, Shvo turned the former gas station into a public art space. The inaugural show "Sheep Station" featured a white picket fence, grass and trees around the gas pumps, and 25 grazing concrete sheep sculptures by late artist François-Xavier Lalanne. The site has been developed into a high-end luxury condominium named The Getty Building, with Peter Marino designated as the architect for both the interior and exterior of the project.

In 2015, Shvo teamed up with Russian billionaire Vladislav Doronin of Aman Resorts to buy New York’s Crown Building, filing plans the next year to convert most of the 26-story office building into condominiums and a hotel--branded the "AMAN New York".
  
In September 2016, Shvo was accused by Manhattan District Attorney of buying art and other luxury items, using them in New York and claiming they had been sent out of state to avoid $1.275 million in sales, use and corporate taxes. Shvo settled the case in 2018 and paid $3.5 million.

In 2018, Shvo purchased the office portion of 685 Fifth Avenue, previously the headquarters of Gucci, from General Growth Partners (GGP), in partnership with Deutsche Finance Group, for 135 million dollars. It has since been disclosed that Shvo will be converting the building into ultra-luxury residences branded as the Mandarin Oriental Residences.

In 2019, Shvo made a number of purchases across asset classes. He purchased the Raleigh Hotel and the adjacent Richmond and South Seas Hotels from Tommy Hilfiger along with partners Deutsche Finance America. The same year, Shvo purchased a long-vacant piece of land on Wilshire Boulevard for $130 million, which the company announced is going to be developed into the Mandarin Oriental Residences Beverly Hills, as well as 711 Fifth Avenue, previously the headquarters of The Coca Cola Company, for $937 million. In 2020, Shvo acquired the Transamerica Pyramid in San Francisco for $650 million, and began work on a $250 million renovation in 2022. Also in 2020, he acquired 333 South Wabash in Chicago, known as Big Red, for $376 million, and 530 Broadway in New York’s Soho district for $382 million.

SHVO

SHVO is a real estate development company founded by Michael Shvo in 2004. It purchases and develops high end properties in the United States and internationally. Notable properties purchased and developed by SHVO have included Transamerica Pyramid in San Francisco, Raleigh Hotel in Miami, Big Red in Chicago, and 711 Fifth Avenue in New York. As of 2021, the company has assets of approximately $8 billion.

Art projects
Shvo has conceived several art projects, including Documents of Desire & Disaster, a retrospective of contemporary photographer David La Chapelle’s work. He partnered with Paul Kasmin Gallery & Serdar Bilgili, who owns the Akaretler area in Istanbul where the exhibition took place in December 2010.
 
Shvo also created Getty Station, a public art installation at the former getty station on 10th avenue and 24th street in Manhattan. He purchased the property in early August 2013 and transformed into a sheep’s meadow with 25 sheep sculptures by Francois Xavier Lalanne. Shvo collaborated with Paul Kasmin Gallery for the exhibit.
 
Shvo also curated the selling exhibition Les Lalanne: The Poetry of Sculpture along with Paul Kasmin at the S|2 Gallery of Sotheby's Auction House in New York. It included rare Lalanne sculptures in a midnight garden setting.

In 2019 Shvo created an exhibition at the Raleigh Hotel, a property he had purchased the same year. Called "Les Lalanne at The Raleigh Gardens," it is a sculpture garden in memory of the French artist François-Xavier Lalanne.

Awards and recognition
Shvo was listed as one of "New York's City Shapers" by The New York Observer in 2007 and made the magazine's list of 100 Most Powerful People in New York Real Estate in 2008. He was also listed in Art+Auctions 2013 Power 100 List.

Personal life
Shvo resides in New York City and The Hamptons with his wife, Seren Shvo. The couple has two children, Emma and Judah.

Further reading
 New York Times feature - "Inside a Power Broker’s Homes"
 New York Times interview with Michael Shvo - October 2013
 Marrying Art & Real Estate - Bloomberg  interview with Michael Shvo
 Artspace interview with Michael Shvo - January 2014

References

External links
 SHVO Official Website

Living people
American real estate businesspeople
20th-century American Jews
Real estate and property developers
1972 births
21st-century American Jews